The Kerala Film Critics Association Awards are presented annually by the Kerala Film Critics Association to honour both artistic and technical excellence of professionals in the Malayalam language film industry of India. The awards were instituted in 1977.

History 
The Kerala Film Critics Association is an organization of film critics from Kerala, India. The association was founded in 1977 when a group of film journalists met at the behest of K. Aniyan, and Baby. It presents the Kerala Film Critics Association Awards each year to honour the finest achievements in filmmaking.
The maiden award was presented to Yudhakandam at a modest function. Since then, the status of the award had increased and the function was becoming more colourful with every passing year.

Juries and rules 
The films are selected by the members of the association. Initially, only those films that were released in theatres were considered for the award. Later, following the state award pattern, all censored films began to be considered. The aspirants have to remit an entry fee of Rs. 500 and the screening charge for contest for the award (as of 2002). The awards are given in several categories. In addition to regular categories, the association occasionally presents special awards. The awards include a cash award of Rs. 1 lakh for the best film. The second best film, best director, best actor and best actress will receive Rs. 25,000 each.

Categories 
 Main awards
 Best Film
 Best Director
 Best Actor
 Best Actress
 Best Screenplay
 Best Story
 Second Best Film
 Best Popular Film
 Best Cinematographer
 Best Music Director
 Best Female Playback Singer
 Best Male Playback Singer
 Best Lyricist
 Second Best Actor/Best Supporting Actor
 Second Best Actress/Best Supporting Actress
 Best Debut Director
 Best Art Director
 Best Editor
 Best Child Artist
 Special Jury Awards

 Honourary awards
 Chalachitra Ratnam Award
 Chalachitra Prathibha Award
 Ruby Jubilee Award

Ceremonies
 2002 – 26th
 2010 – 34th 
 2011 – 35th
 2013 – 37th
 2014 – 38th
 2015 – 39th
 2016 – 40th
 2017 – 41st
 2018 – 42nd
 2019 – 43rd
 2020 – 44th
 2021 – 45th

List of films with most number of awards
This is a list of films receiving the most awards at each awards ceremony.

References

External links 
 

Indian film awards
Malayalam cinema
Kerala awards
1977 establishments in Kerala
Awards established in 1977
Kerala Film Critics Association Awards